The 2009 Duhamel municipal election took place on November 1, 2009, to elect a mayor and councillors in Duhamel, Quebec. David Pharand was elected as the community's new mayor.

Results

Patrick Douglas was appointed to chair Duhamel's environmental health committee after the election.

Source: Résultants 2009; Affaires municipales, Régions et Occupation du Territoire, Government of Quebec.

References

2009 Quebec municipal elections